Andre Blaze Henshaw (born 14 August 1983) is a Nigerian radio personality, rapper, television host and executive producer. He first gained notice as a member of the hip hop group Tuck Tyght Allstars. His radio career began at Rhythm 93.7 FM Port Harcourt, where he worked for over six years before joining Nigezie as a TV host. In May 2012, he quit his job at the cable TV channel after four years, later accepting an offer to host Nigeria's Got Talent. Prior to this, he had hosted several other reality television talent shows including True Search, Battle of the Year and Peak Talent Show. He is also an anchor for the Google Digital Skills for Africa Training Programme.

Early life
Blaze was born to a mother from Anambra State and a father from Cross River State. He grew up in both Port Harcourt and Calabar.

Education 
Blaze pursued his undergraduate studies in Linguistics and Communication at the University of Port Harcourt, completing a B.Sc. degree in 2006.

Career

Music
As a rapper, Blaze achieved early notoriety as a member of Port Harcourt based hip hop group Tuck Tyght.

Radio
He followed in the footsteps of his mentor Loknan Dombin and began his broadcasting career working for Rhythm 93.7 FM Port Harcourt. While there he held various positions such as head of the Presentation Department, continuity announcer, radio DJ and show host.

Television
Blaze moved on to television, becoming Nigezie's Top Ten music video countdown anchor. Between 2008 and 2012, he directed an array of successful TV programs in the country. In addition, he hosted shows like True Search, Battle of the Year and Peak Talent Show. In May 2012, Blaze officially quit his job at the cable TV channel. He would later accept an offer to host Nigeria's Got Talent, a reality television show based on the Got Talent series format.

Personal life
Andre Blaze is a cousin of actress Kate Henshaw-Nuttal. He has two children, twin girls by his long-time girlfriend.

See also
Music of Port Harcourt
List of people from Port Harcourt
List of Nigerian media personalities

References

1983 births
Living people
Rappers from Port Harcourt
Radio personalities from Port Harcourt
Nigerian infotainers
Nigerian radio presenters
Nigerian television presenters
People from Calabar
Television personalities from Rivers State
University of Port Harcourt alumni
Silverbird Communications people